Caulophacus is a genus of glass sponges belonging to the subfamily Lanuginellinae.

Species 
Subgenus Caulophacus (Caulodiscus) Ijima, 1927
 Caulophacus brandtae Janussen, Tabachnick & Tendal, 2004
 Caulophacus leonieae  Buskowiak & Janussen, 2021
 Caulophacus lotifolium Ijima, 1903
 Caulophacus onychohexactinus Tabachnick & Levi, 2004
 Caulophacus polyspicula Tabachnick, 1990
 Caulophacus valdiviae Schulze, 1904
Subgenus Caulophacus (Caulophacella) Lendenfeld, 1915
 Caulophacus tenuis Lendenfeld, 1915
Subgenus Caulophacus (Caulophacus) Schulze, 1886
 Caulophacus abyssalis Tabachnick, 1990
 Caulophacus adakensis Reiswig & Stone, 2013
 Caulophacus agassizi Schulze, 1899
 Caulophacus antarcticus Schulze & Kirkpatrick, 1910
 Caulophacus arcticus (Hansen, 1885)
 Caulophacus basispinosus Levi, 1964
 Caulophacus chilensis Reiswig & Araya, 2014
 Caulophacus cyanae Boury-Esnault & De Vos, 1988
 Caulophacus discohexactinus Janussen, Tabachnick & Tendal, 2004
 Caulophacus discohexaster Tabachnick & Levi, 2004
 Caulophacus elegans Schulze, 1886
 Caulophacus galatheae Levi, 1964
 Caulophacus hadalis Levi, 1964
 Caulophacus instabilis Topsent, 1910
 Caulophacus latus Schulze, 1886
 Caulophacus oviformis (Schulze, 1886)
 Caulophacus palmeri Goodwin, Berman, Janussen, Göcke & Hendry, 2016
 Caulophacus pipetta (Schulze, 1886)
 Caulophacus schulzei Wilson, 1904
 Caulophacus scotiae Topsent, 1910
 Caulophacus variens Tabachnick, 1988
 Caulophacus wilsoni Kersken, Janussen & Martínez Arbizu, 2018 (interim unpublished)
Subgenus Caulophacus (Oxydiscus) Janussen, Tabachnick & Tendal, 2004
 Caulophacus weddelli Janussen, Tabachnick & Tendal, 2004

See also 
 List of prehistoric sponge genera

References 

 Reiswig, H.M.; Araya, J.F. 2014: A review of the Hexactinellida (Porifera) of Chile, with the first record of Caulophacus Schulze, 1885 (Lyssacinosida: Rossellidae) from the southeastern Pacific Ocean. Zootaxa 3889 (3): 413–428,

External links 

 

Hexactinellida genera